Sir John Pundari  (born 7 January 1967) is a Papua New Guinean politician. He has been Speaker of the National Parliament (1997–1999), Deputy Prime Minister (1999), Minister for Foreign Affairs (2001), and currently serving as the Minister of Finance and Rural Development since 20 December 2020.

First elected to Parliament in the 1992 general election, as MP for Kompiam-Ambum, he was elected Speaker after retaining his seat in the 1997 election. He founded the Advance Papua New Guinea Party in May 1999, with twenty-two MPs, announcing his intention to challenge for the premiership. He accused Prime Minister Bill Skate's government of persistent political interference in administrative processes, including police investigations, and of a general lack of ethics. Pundari resigned as Speaker in July, and helped Mekere Morauta form a majority in Parliament to successfully challenge for the premiership. Morauta, as the new Prime Minister, appointed him  Deputy Prime Minister and Minister for Women, Youth and Churches. In December, however, Morauta sacked him, citing the need for "political stability" in the coalition government. Pundari and his party were re-admitted to the Morauta government in April 2000, and he was appointed Minister for Lands and Physical Planning, then Minister for Foreign Affairs in May 2001. In October, he was sacked again, after disagreeing publicly with Morauta on the question of Papua New Guinea's participation in the Australian government's "Pacific Solution". Australia had begun deporting to a detention camp in Papua New Guinea asylum seekers who had arrived by boat in Australia; Pundari opposed the sending of 1,000 additional detainees to the camp.

He founded the Papua New Guinea Revival Party and led it into the 2002 election. He retained his seat in the 2007 election, this time as a member of the National Advance Party, and was appointed Minister for Mining by Prime Minister Michael Somare in July 2010. Somare was replaced as Prime Minister by Peter O'Neill in August 2011, and Pundari lost his position in government. Becoming a member of O'Neill's People's National Congress Party, he was appointed Minister for the Environment and Conservation in O'Neill's government following the 2012 general election.

Pundari is an active member and leader of the Seventh-day Adventist Church in Papua New Guinea.

The Honorable John Pundari, was recognized as a Companion of the Order of St Michael for his services to his country as a Member of the National Parliament, by Queen Elizabeth II on her birthday in 2014.

In 2022, Pundari founded the Liberal Party to compete in the 2022 Papua New Guinean general election.

References

Living people
1967 births
Members of the National Parliament of Papua New Guinea
Ministers of Finance of Papua New Guinea
Government ministers of Papua New Guinea
Deputy Prime Ministers of Papua New Guinea
Speakers of the National Parliament of Papua New Guinea
Foreign Ministers of Papua New Guinea
Papua New Guinean Seventh-day Adventists
Knights Commander of the Order of the British Empire
Companions of the Order of St Michael and St George